Jessica Fullalove (born 27 July 1996 in Oldham, England) is a British backstroke swimmer.

Fullalove competed at the 2013 FINA World Junior Swimming Championships in Dubai, United Arab Emirates, and at the 2014 Commonwealth Games in Glasgow, Scotland. She was a part of the team for the 2014 Summer Youth Olympics in Nanjing, China, in August. also competed at the commonwealth games in Glasgow, 2014.

Fullalove swims with the City Of Manchester Aquatics and resides in Manchester.

References

External links
British Association athlete profile
Britain at the 2013 Fina Junior Championships

1996 births
Living people
English female swimmers
Female backstroke swimmers
Swimmers at the 2014 Summer Youth Olympics
Swimmers at the 2014 Commonwealth Games
Commonwealth Games competitors for England